
Gmina Lniano is a rural gmina (administrative district) in Świecie County, Kuyavian-Pomeranian Voivodeship, in north-central Poland.

The gmina contains part of the protected area called Wda Landscape Park.

Villages
Gmina Lniano contains the villages and settlements of Błądzim, Brzemiona, Jędrzejewo, Jeziorki, Lniano, Lubodzież, Mukrz, Ostrowite, Siemkowo and Wętfie.

Neighbouring gminas
Gmina Lniano is bordered by the gminas of Bukowiec, Cekcyn, Drzycim, Osie and Świekatowo.

References
Polish official population figures 2006

Lniano
Świecie County